Antenen is a Swiss surname. Notable people with the surname include:

Charles Antenen (1929–2000), Swiss footballer
Georges Antenen (1903–1979), Swiss cyclist
Meta Antenen (born 1949), Swiss pentathlete

See also

Antonen

Surnames of Swiss origin